The Republican–Socialist Conjunction (CRS) was a Spanish electoral coalition created in 1909 and lasting until 1919. It comprised different parties during its short lifespan, but it always included the Spanish Socialist Workers' Party (PSOE) and at least several Republican members. It was disbanded in December 1919 after the PSOE left the alliance.

Composition

Electoral performance

Restoration Cortes

References

1893 establishments in Spain
1903 disestablishments in Spain
Defunct political party alliances in Spain
Political parties disestablished in 1903
Political parties established in 1893
Republican parties in Spain
Restoration (Spain)
Spanish Socialist Workers' Party